A remote controlled weapon station (RCWS), or remote weapon station (RWS), also known as a remote weapon system (RWS), is a remotely operated weaponized system often equipped with fire-control system for light and medium-caliber weapons which can be installed on a ground combat vehicle or sea- and air-based combat platforms. 

Such equipment is used on modern military vehicles, as it allows a gunner to remain in the relative protection of the vehicle.  It may be retrofitted onto existing vehicles, for example, the Crows system is being fitted to American Humvees.

Examples 
 
 Electro Optic Systems
 
 FN Herstal: deFNder Family
 
 REMAX
 
 Rheinmetall Canada: Fieldranger
 
 UW4A
 CS/LK4
 H/PJ17

Hornet
Hornet Lite
Hornet S

 Patria: PML 127 OWS
 :
 DRWS-1
 DRWS-2
 RWS-23
 :
 FLW 100, FLW 200 and FLW 200+
 :
 BEL RCWS
 MDSL RWS
 SHARANG RWS
 
 ARIO-H762
 Raad - 30mm remote control turret
 :
Typhoon Weapon System 
Samson Remote Controlled Weapon Station 
Rafael Overhead Weapon Station
 :
 Hitfist
Hitfist OWS 
 Hitrole
 
 Kongsberg Defence Systems: Protector (RWS)
 
 ZSMU Kobuz
 ZSSW-30
 
XTR-101/102 - 20mm remote control turret
 
Pro Optica Anubis
 
Bumerang-BM - 30mm remote control turret
 AU-220M - 57mm remote control turret

 Сервал
 
 BAE Systems Land Systems South Africa: TRT-25 remote weapon station
 Reutech Solutions: Rogue
 
Saab: Trackfire

Aselsan SMASH: It is a stabilized weapon station manufactured by Aselsan and fitted with 30mm Mk44 Bushmaster II autocanon.
Aselsan STOP : It is fitted with either a 25 mm Oerlikon KBA or a M242 Bushmaster autocanon.
Aselsan STAMP, Aselsan STAMP-2: These can be fitted with either a 7.62 mm / 12.7 mm machine gun or a 40 mm grenade launcher.
Aselsan STAMP-G: It can be fitted with either a 12.7 mm GAU-19 gatling gun or a 7.62 mm / 12.7 mm machine gun or a 40 mm Mk 19 grenade launcher.

Combat module SPYS-SYNTEZ, NATO nomenclature code: 2510-61-015-0429  
Parus
 Doublet
 Taipan
 Shturm-M
 Kastet

 MSI-Defence Systems: Seahawk DS Remote
 Thales: SWARM
 
 CROWS
 Typhoon Weapon Station: including Typhoon models designated MK38 MOD 2  and later MK 38 MOD 3, and the Mini-Typhoon models designated MK49 MOD 0 ROSAM (Remote Operated Small Arms Mount) and later MK49 MOD 1.

See also 
 Gun turret
 Sentry gun

References

External link

RWS